The Château de Frugie is a château in Saint-Pierre-de-Frugie, Dordogne, Nouvelle-Aquitaine, France.

Châteaux in Dordogne
Monuments historiques of Dordogne